Ölsboda is a village situated in Degerfors Municipality, Örebro County, Sweden, with 50 inhabitants in 2010.

See also 

 Ölsboda Manor

References 

Populated places in Degerfors Municipality